McKendree Chapel, also known as Old McKendree Chapel is a historic chapel located at Jackson, Missouri. It is a log cabin style chapel that was built in 1819 and is known as the oldest Protestant church standing west of the Mississippi River.  The church was organized in July 1809.  Adjacent to the church is the cemetery.

It was listed on the National Register of Historic Places in 1987, with a boundary increase in 2006.

References

Churches on the National Register of Historic Places in Missouri
Churches completed in 1819
Log buildings and structures on the National Register of Historic Places in Missouri
19th-century churches in the United States
Religious buildings and structures in Missouri
Buildings and structures in Jackson County, Missouri
National Register of Historic Places in Jackson County, Missouri